Williams River State Forest covers   in Chester in Windham County, Vermont. The forest is managed by the Vermont Department of Forests, Parks, and Recreation. 

Activities in the forest include hiking, snowshoeing, hunting and wildlife viewing.

The south branch of Williams River (Vermont) flows along the edge of the forest.

References

External links
Official website

Vermont state forests
Protected areas of Windham County, Vermont
Chester, Vermont